Hir is a gender-neutral pronoun used in place of him/her or his/her.

Hir or HIR may also refer to:

Places
 Hir, Iran, a city in Ardabil Province, Iran
 Hir District, a district in Ardabil Province, Iran
 Hir Rural District, a rural district in Ardabil Province, Iran
 Hir, Qazvin, a village in Qazvin Province, Iran
 Hir, Sistan and Baluchestan, a village in Sistan and Baluchestan Province, Iran
 Honiara International Airport (IATA code), Solomon Islands

People
 Hir Vijay Suri (17th century), Indian Jain
 Ieuan Brydydd Hir (1450–1485), Welsh language poet
 Rhun Hir ap Maelgwn (died c. 586), king of Gwynedd

Other uses
 Harvard International Review, a quarterly journal on international affairs
 Halogen Infrared Reflective, a type of lightbulb
 Humoral immunity (Humoral Immune Response)

See also
 Her (disambiguation)
 Hur (disambiguation)
 Le Hir
 Ynys-hir